Oscar Camilo Salomón (born 22 March 1999) is an Argentine professional footballer who plays as a centre-back for Tigre, on loan from Boca Juniors.

Club career
Salomón's youth career started with Centro De Educación Física Nº18, with whom he notably won the Gothia Cup with; which was followed by a move to Boca Juniors in 2012. On 1 August 2019, Salomón agreed to join newly-promoted Primera División team Central Córdoba on loan. After being an unused substitute in the league against Talleres on 16 August, the defender appeared for his professional debut on 21 August in a Copa Argentina victory versus All Boys; featuring for forty-five minutes, prior to Francisco Manenti coming on in his place.

In January 2022, Salomón was loaned out to Tigre until the end of 2022.

International career
Salomón represented Argentina's U20s at the 2018 South American Games in Bolivia, notably scoring in a semi-final loss to Uruguay. He also received a call-up to their U19s.

Personal life
Salomón's father and grandfather were both footballers, his father Fabián played for San Martín while grandfather Oscar appeared for Central Norte.

Career statistics
.

References

External links

1999 births
Living people
Sportspeople from San Miguel de Tucumán
Argentine footballers
Argentina youth international footballers
Argentina under-20 international footballers
Association football defenders
Boca Juniors footballers
Central Córdoba de Santiago del Estero footballers
Club Atlético Tigre footballers